Kyalashbek is an abandoned village in the Aragatsotn Province of Armenia.

See also 
Aragatsotn Province

References 

Former populated places in Aragatsotn Province